Microgiton eos is a moth of the subfamily Arctiinae. It was described by Herbert Druce in 1899. It is found in Ecuador.

The forewings are black with a streak at the base and four yellowish-white spots at the end of the cell. The hindwings are white, very broadly bordered with black.

References

 

Arctiinae